Godeok Bridge (Hangul: 고덕대교) is a cable-stayed bridge under construction between Seoul and Guri, Gyeonggi Province South Korea.

It will carry the Sejong–Pocheon Expressway over the Han River to solve traffic issues on the Seoul Ring Expressay on the Gangdong Bridge.

References

See also 
 Transportation in South Korea
 List of bridges in South Korea

Cable-stayed bridges in South Korea
Bridges in Seoul
Bridges in Gyeonggi Province
Buildings and structures in Guri